El Diario Montañés is a Spanish language daily regional newspaper published in Santander, Spain. Founded in 1902 it is one of the oldest publications in the country.

History and profile
El Diario Montañés was first published on 1 August 1902. The paper is part of Grupo Vocento. The other newspapers owned by the company include ABC, El Correo, El Diario Vasco, La Verdad and Las Provincias.

El Diario Montañés is published by Editorial Cantabria S.A. in Santander. The paper was the official media outlet of the World J80 Championships held in Santander between 4 and 11 July 2009.

During the 2009-2010 period El Diario Montañés was one of the best-selling regional newspapers in Spain with a circulation of 33,374 copies.

References

External links

1902 establishments in Spain
Daily newspapers published in Spain
Grupo Vocento
Mass media in Santander, Spain
Publications established in 1902
Spanish-language newspapers